Aubrey Williams (1926–1990) was a Guyanese artist. Other people of the same name include:
 Aubrey Williams (British Army officer) (1888–1977)
 Aubrey Willis Williams (1890–1965), American activist

See also
 Gwilym Gwent (1834–1891), Welsh composer born William Aubrey Williams